Artist-Led Initiatives Support Network, abbreviated ALISN, is a non-profit international support network for artists which provides exhibition spaces, strategic support, education, creative facilitation and artist-to-artist exchange. ALISN was founded in 2007 by designer Jordan Dalladay-Simpson (Goldsmiths Alumnus) and artist Iavor Lubomirov (Oxford University Alumnus). ALISN was previously known as AFMMXII (Artists for 2012), and was officially re-branded as ALISN in August 2009.

History
Artist-Led Initiatives Support Network began when Iavor Lubomirov and Jordan Dalladay-Simpson met in 2006 while organising a pop-up exhibition for art students and recent art graduates in a disused office building in London. At the time Lubomirov had recently left his art degree at University of East London and Dalladay-Simpson was an undergraduate studying design at Goldsmiths. Both founders were looking for ways of showing work and collaborating with other struggling artists to organise and promote art events. The show attracted over 300 visitors and laid the ground for future working relationships between the artists involved.

In November 2007, ALISN was officially launched under the name of Artists for 2012 (AF2012) and held a pilot show of 5 emerging artists at the 491 Gallery, east London.

ALISN's next project was facilitating the Goldsmiths/BAA Expo Award 08, which would see two large-scale sculptures installed in the departures lounge of the newly opened Heathrow Terminal 5. This project was done in collaboration with BAA and Goldsmiths students, with mentor-ship from Cathy de Monchaux and Andrew Shoben and oversight from the global communications company Imagination. The two winning teams built and installed Arc and Taking Place. Arc was by London-based art-collective Lobby, and Taking Place by Sally Hogarth and Emma Johnson.

At the start of 2009, ALISN aided the formation of the Hackney Transients Art Project (HTAP), which is an east London arts organisation founded by Lucy Tomlins and Marnie Baumer. HTAP went on to produce two collaborative events that year, the workshop-based Pattern-making for Beginners as part of the annual HackneyWICKed Art Festival and In/Flux exhibition on Kingsland Road, Hackney, London. They also produced an Oral History Archive containing ethnographic recordings the opinions of various Hackney residents regarding the area's 'transient nature'. The project was also featured on the British Community Channel.

In August 2008, ALISN embarked on a second independent collaborative arts exhibition, under the name Art in the Carpark. This event took place in October, in the CCP Cark Park, Liverpool, and was in collaboration with the underground arts organisation The Arts Organisation (TAO). The event featured a diverse range of artwork from 14 Artists, and was part of the Liverpool Independents Biennial.

In the summer of 2009, a decision was made by the founders to find a name more appropriate to the way the organisation had been working, as well as reflecting the models of creative facilitation it had developed, AF2012 was re-branded as ALISN in August 2009.

In 2009 ALISN started a working relationship with Goldsmiths Creative Enterprise Society, launching this indefinite partnership with a talk entitled In Conversation with ALISN followed by a series of art-film screenings. The screenings included David's Buchanan's feature-length musical The Last Babacus and Minou Norouzi's The Anatomy of Failure (HotDocs Selection 2008) with talks by the Film makers.

At the start of 2010 the ALISN founders were gifted a stable home by a philanthropic London property developer. The Magnificent Basement is in Farringdon, Central London.

Network 
ALISN says its emphasis is not simply on showing art, but on bringing the artists themselves into contact with each other to accomplish development through cross-pollination of ideas, critical peer feedback, transfer of experience and networking. The organisation does this by maintaining a virtual community of artists and other individuals within the creative industries.

ALISN has a network of more than 500 international artists, which is managed by the founders with the assistance of the organisations fellows. Since its conception, they made use of online social networking platforms to support its network, maintaining the artist network through Facebook, Twitter and CargoCollective. ALISN also uses these channels to disseminate open calls for participation and promote events. The support network is maintained by the founders Dalladay-Simpson and Lubomirov, with the help of an organisational administrator.

Events, exhibitions and projects 
 PUSH, Improvised Art Space, Wandsworth, London, UK. March 2005.
 AF2012 @ 491 Gallery, Leytonstone, London, UK. November 2007.
 Art in the Carpark, Liverpool, UK. October 2008.
 Fresh Air Machine, Calvert 22, London, UK. September 2008.
 BAA Expo, Heathrow Terminal 5, London, UK. September–December 2008.
 Pattern Making for Beginners (HTAP), Hackney Wicked Festival, London, UK. August 2009.
 Needle & Scalpel, Wandsworth, London, UK. July 2009.
 Room to Breathe, Wandsworth, London, UK. July 2009.
 In/Flux (HTAP), Hackney, London, UK. September 2009.
 Facilitating Collaboration in the Arts. HTAP Seminar Series on Collaboration. Hackney, London, UK. September 2009.
 Creative Enterprise Society Presents: In Conversation with ALISN, Goldsmiths, London, UK. November 2009.
 The Last Babacus (Screening, Talk and Q&A), Goldsmiths, London, UK. November 2009.
 The Anatomy of Failure & Hope For Pinok (Screening, Talk and Q&A), Goldsmiths, London, UK. December 2009.
 artINTERACT, Abu Dhabi, UAE. June 2010.
 Lubomirov & Batiste in The Magnificent Basement, Farringdon, London, UK. June 2010.
 Sharon Gal's Venus Rising in The Magnificent Basement, Farringdon, London, UK. July 2010.
 Daryl Brown – The Judo Series in The Magnificent Basement, Farringdon, London, UK. July 2010.
 Art Idol 2010 – Curated by Marsha Bradfield. London, UK. July 2010
 Off the Clock; Mile End Art Pavilion, London, UK; The Magnificent Basement, London, UK; 92YTribeca, New York City; Like The Spice Gallery, New York City; October – November 2010.
 Alison Gill's Fibonacci Rabbit Generator, Mile End Art Pavilion, London, UK. November 2010.
 Tower Hamlets Spring Open 2011, Mile End Art Pavilion, London, UK. April 2011.
 Conference for Emerging Art Organisers 2011, Goldsmiths, London, UK. November 2011.

Collaborators
 Stephan Bischof – Designer of the Wheelie bin urinal
 Lee Broughall – Jerwood Contemporary Painters Selection 2009
 Rebecca Court – Winner of the 4 New Sensations Channel 4 Prize 2009
 Sharon Gal – Founding Member of Resonance FM
 Sy Hackney – Founding Member of 491 Gallery
 Sally Hogarth – Winner of IdeasTap Fund 2009
 Cathy de Monchaux – Shortlisted for Turner Prize
 Minou Norouzi – Hot Docs Selection 2008
 Andrew Shoben – Founder of Greyworld
 Charlie Tweed – Bloomberg New Contemporaries 2007

See also
 Artist-run initiative
 Creative Industries
 Arts administration
 Virtual community

References

Arts organisations based in the United Kingdom
Arts in England
Community websites